Razorblade  may refer to:

"Razorblade", song from the 2003 album History for Sale by Blue October
Razorblade Romance, an album by Finnish rock band HIM
Razorblade Suitcase, an album by UK post-grunge band Bush
"Razorblade", a song from American rock band The Strokes' album First Impressions of Earth
Razor, a bladed tool primarily used for shaving
"Razorblade", song from the 2013 album The Nexus by Amaranthe